Nocloa is a genus of moths of the family Noctuidae. The genus was erected by John Bernhardt Smith in 1906.

Species
Nocloa alcandra (H. Druce, 1890) Mexico
Nocloa aliaga (Barnes, 1905) Arizona, New Mexico
Nocloa beata Dyar, 1918 Mexico
Nocloa cordova (Barnes, 1907) Arizona
Nocloa duplicatus (J. B. Smith, 1891) Colorado
Nocloa ezeha Dyar, 1914 Mexico
Nocloa lamiota Dyar, 1918 Mexico
Nocloa nanata (Neumoegen, 1884) New Mexico
Nocloa pallens (Tepper, 1883) California
Nocloa periodita Dyar, 1913 Mexico
Nocloa pilacho (Barnes, 1904) Arizona
Nocloa plagiata J. B. Smith, 1906 Arizona
Nocloa rivulosa J. B. Smith, 1906 Arizona, California

References

Hadeninae